Bard is an extinct town in Clark County, in the U.S. state of Nevada.

The community was named after D. C. Bard, a natural scientist; it was located on the Union Pacific Railroad line south of Las Vegas.

References

Ghost towns in Clark County, Nevada